Portland was a 40-gun fourth-rate frigate of the English Royal Navy, originally built for the navy of the Commonwealth of England at Wapping, and launched in 1653. By 1677 her armament had been increased to 48 guns. She took part in the Battle of Bantry Bay in 1689, when her Irish-born captain George Aylmer was killed in action.

Portland was burnt in 1692 to prevent her from being captured.

Notes

References

Lavery, Brian (2003) The Ship of the Line - Volume 1: The development of the battlefleet 1650-1850. Conway Maritime Press. .

Ships of the line of the Royal Navy
1650s ships
Ships built in Wapping
Captured ships